Antonio Benedetti (died 1556) was a Roman Catholic prelate who served as Bishop of Guardialfiera (1552–1556).

Biography
On 12 September 1552, Antonio Benedetti was appointed by Pope Julius III as Bishop of Guardialfiera. He served as Bishop of Guardialfiera until his death in 1556.

References

External links and additional sources
 (for Chronology of Bishops) 
 (for Chronology of Bishops) 

16th-century Italian Roman Catholic bishops
1552 deaths
Bishops appointed by Pope Julius III